Soakimi Gatafahefa (1838 – 24 May 1896), also known as simply Soakimi Gata, a Polynesian transliteration of Joachim Gata, was the first Roman Catholic priest from Polynesia. He worked in several Oceanic countries including Tonga, Samoa, Fiji, Wallis and Futuna, and later Australia and New Zealand.

Biography

Gatafahefa was born on Lakeba in the Lau Islands, Fiji, the son of Tongan parents. From the island of Tongatapu, his family were relatives of Tāufaʻāhau, the later Tongan King George Tupou I. Gatafahefa converted to Roman Catholicism with his father. Baptised as Soakimi or Joachim, he spent most of his formative years on Futuna. He entered the school at Kolopelu, on Futuna, and then the Seminary of Lano, on Wallis, founded by the French Marist missionary priest, Bishop Pierre Bataillon, the Vicar Apostolic of Central Oceania.

Recognising his potential, Bishop Bataillon took Gatafahefa with him to Sydney, New South Wales, for further education. In 1856, he took him to Europe along with two other Polynesian students: a Rotuman named Rafaele and a Wallisian named Motesito. They visited France and Rome, Italy, where Gatafahefa met Pope Pius IX. Staying in Rome, the three students attended the Propaganda College and studied to become priests. He was the only one of the Polynesian students to finish his studies and was ordained to the priesthood by Cardinal Costantino Patrizi Naro on 10 June 1865 at the Archbasilica of St. John Lateran. Thus he became the first Polynesian to be ordained a priest. Despite his training in Europe, his later appointments in Tonga, Samoa, Wallis and Futuna were met with controversy. Encyclopaedic sources claim that Bishop Bataillon believed that Gatafahefa was attempting to persuade the people of Futuna to distance themselves from European Roman Catholic clergymen.

After these incidents, Gatafahefa was sent for retraining in Sydney and New Caledonia. Archbishop Redwood accepted him into the Archdiocese of Wellington as long as no mention was made of his past. So he subsequently lived and worked for twenty years in New Zealand most of them as a lay brother at the Marist Mission Station and later Seminary in Meeanee, where he was known as "Brother Joe." He died on 24 May 1896, at the age of 58, and was buried in the Taradale Cemetery, Napier, Hawke's Bay; the name "Father Joachim Gata Gatafahefa" is now inscribed on his gravestone. After his death, although other Polynesians entered the priesthoods, no indigenous Tongans were ordained as Catholic clergymen until 1925.

References

Bibliography
Angleveil, Frederic (2007). "The first Oceanian priest, Soakimi Gata". Marist Messenger. April and May.

1838 births
1896 deaths
19th-century Roman Catholic priests
Tongan expatriates in Australia
Tongan expatriates in Fiji
Tongan expatriates in Italy
Tongan expatriates in New Zealand
Tongan Roman Catholic priests
Wallis and Futuna religious leaders
People from Lakeba
People from Tongatapu
Converts to Roman Catholicism from pagan religions
Seminary of Lano alumni